Selman may refer to:

People with the surname
 Alan Selman (1941-2021), American mathematician
 Bart Selman, American computer scientist
 Bill Selman, American ice hockey coach
 Carol Selman, American historian
 Courtenay Selman (born 1945), Barbadian cricketer
 David Selman (1878–1937), American film director
 Hafız Selman İzbeli, Turkish militiawoman
 Jim Selman (born 1942), American consultant, coach, and author
 JoAnn Dayton-Selman, American politician
 John Selman (disambiguation), multiple people
 Joshua Selman, Nigerian televangelist
 Manuel Selman (born 1989), Chilean surfer
 Matt Selman, American writer and producer
 Matty Selman, American lyricist
 Nick Selman (born 1995), English cricketer
 Redžep Selman (born 1986), Macedonian triple jumper
 Robert L. Selman (born 1942), American psychologist
 Rubén Selman (born 1963), Chilean football referee
 Sam Selman (born 1990), American baseball pitcher
 Shakera Selman (born 1989), West Indian cricketer
 William Selman (disambiguation), multiple people

People with the first name 
 Selman Ada (born 1953), Turkish composer, conductor and pianist
 Selman Akbulut (born 1949), Turkish mathematician
 Selman Kadria (1906-1938), Albanian land worker, folk singer and independence fighter in Kosovo
 Selman Kaygusuz (born 1963), Turkish wrestler
 Selman Mesbeh (born 1980), Quatari footballer
 Selman Reis (fl. 16th century), Ottoman admiral and former corsair
 Selman Riza (1908-1988), Albanian linguist and Albanologist
 Selman Selmanagić (1905-1986), Bosnian-German architect
 Selman Sevinç (born 1995), Dutch-Turkish footballer
 Selman Stërmasi (1908-1976), Albanian football player and coach
 Selman Uranues, Austrian physician and professor of surgery
 Selman Waksman (1888-1973), Jewish Russian Empire-born American inventor, biochemist and microbiologist

Places

United States
 Selman, Florida
 Selman, Oklahoma
 Selman City, Texas
 Mount Selman, Texas

Other places
 Selman, Eğil, Turkey
 Wadi es-Selman, Arabic name of Ayalon Valley, Israel

See also
 Sleman, capital of Sleman Regency, Indonesia
 Selma (disambiguation)